Dominican Republic-Switzerland relations refers to the bilateral relations between The Dominican Republic and Swiss Confederation. Dominican Republic has an embassy in Bern and a consulate-general in Zurich and Switzerland has an embassy in Santo Domingo.

History
In 1936, Switzerland formally recognized the Dominican Republic and opened a consulate in Santo Domingo. During World War 2, Switzerland represented the DR's interests to several countries in Europe. In 1957, the consulate upgraded to a Consulate General and in 2007, the Consulate General was uploaded to an Embassy. The Swiss Embassy is also responsible for consular affairs with Haiti, Dominica, St Kitts and Nevis and Antigua and Barbuda.

Tourism
Switzerland sends large numbers of tourists to Dominican Republic every year.

Trade
Switzerland is the DR's second largest export partner. The DR exported $US 771 million worth of goods to Switzerland in 2019. Gold accounted for 96% of all exports to Switzerland. Switzerland, in the same year, exported $US 39.8 Million to the DR, with the most common exports being Computers and Metal Watches.

Immigration
2,077 Swiss citizens live in the DR, making it the largest community of Swiss in the Caribbean. As of 2017, there were 11,454 Dominican citizens living in Switzerland.

See also 

 Foreign relations of the Dominican Republic
 Foreign relations of Switzerland

Notes and references 

Dominican Republic–Switzerland relations
Switzerland
Bilateral relations of Switzerland